Dinaburg FC was a Latvian football club, playing in the city of Daugavpils. In 2009 it merged with FK Daugava. The club played at the Daugava Stadium (capacity 4,070). On October 5, 2009, Dinaburg was expelled from the Virsliga and both the president and trainer were banned for life on suspicion of betting and match-fixing.

History

Historic names
1994 – Auseklis
1995 – Vilan-D
1996 – Dinaburg FC

Soviet club (1944–1994)
Following the re-occupation of Baltic states after the World War II, in 1944 there was formed football club. During the Soviet period it was often known under name of Celtnieks or Stroitel (in Russian). After dissolution of the Soviet Union, the club became bankrupt and participated in competitions fielding its football academy, DYuSSh Daugavpils. In 1992-1994 there existed for short period Auseklis Daugavpils.

Season 2006

They qualified to play with Hibernian, of Scotland, in the second round of the 2006 Intertoto Cup after beating Havnar Bóltfelag, from the Faroe Islands, 2–1 on aggregate in the first round. They lost 8–0 on aggregate, losing 5–0 in Edinburgh and 3–0 in Daugavpils.

Season 2007
FC Dinaburg Daugavpils were eliminated from the Baltic League 2007 due to violation of Fair Play rules, but they once again qualified for the Intertoto Cup, where they started against Irish League team Cliftonville, but they lost 2–1 on aggregate, losing at home 1–0 after a 1–1 draw in Belfast.

Season 2009
They qualified to play JK Nõmme Kalju from Estonian Meistriliiga, Estonia, in the first round of the UEFA Europa League. They won 2–1 in Daugavpils, and drew 0–0 in Tallinn. In the second round they played Bnei Yehuda Tel Aviv F.C.
In Israel they lost 4–0 and 1–0 in Daugavpils. Later that season they were relegated from both leagues they participated in – Virsliga and The Baltic Football League, because of suspicions about match-fixing and illegal betting.

FK Daugava Daugavpils took their place in Virsliga 2010, having all the players that previously played for Dinaburg in their squad, except those who joined new clubs during the transfer season.

Honours
Latvian Cup winners (1)
 1991
 Virslīga runners-up (1)
 1995
Latvian Cup runners-up (1)
 2001

Participation in Latvian Championships
 2009 – 9th (relegated)
 2008 – 4th
 2007 – 7th
 2006 – 4th
 2005 – 4th
 2004 – 4th
 2003 – 4th
 2002 – 4th
 2001 – 4th
 2000 – 4th
 1999 – 4th
 1998 – 4th
 1997 – 3rd
 1996 – 3rd
 1995 – 2nd
 1994 – 9th
 1993 – 5th
 1992 – 7th
 1991 – 4th

European record

UEFA Cup 1996–97
Preliminary round
 Barry Town F.C.
1st leg: 0–0
2nd leg: 1–2
Aggregate: 1–2
UEFA Cup Winners' Cup 1997–98
Qualifying round
 FK Gäncä
1st leg: 1–0
2nd leg: 1–0
Aggregate: 2–0
First round
 AEK Athens
1st leg: 0–5
2nd leg: 2–4
Aggregate: 2–9

UEFA Intertoto Cup 1998
First round
 OD Trencin
1st leg:1–1
2nd leg:1–4
Aggregate:2–5

UEFA Intertoto Cup 2000
First round
 OD Trencin
1st leg:3-0
2nd leg:1-0
Aggregate:4-0
Second round
 Aalborg Boldspilklub
1st leg:0–0
2nd leg:0–1
Aggregate:0–1

UEFA Cup 2001–02
Qualifying round
 NK Osijek
1st leg:2–1
2nd leg:0–1
Aggregate:2–2(lost on away goals)

UEFA Intertoto Cup 2002
First round
 Zagłębie Lubin
1st leg:1–1
2nd leg:1–0
Aggregate:2–1
Second round
 FC Krylia Sovetov Samara
1st leg:0–3
2nd leg:0–1
Aggregate:0–4

UEFA Intertoto Cup 2003
First round
 FC Wil
1st leg:1–0
2nd leg:0–2
Aggregate:1–2

UEFA Intertoto Cup 2004
First round
 Aberystwyth Town F.C.
1st leg:0–0
2nd leg:4–0
Aggregate:4–0
Second round
 OFK Beograd
1st leg:1–3
2nd leg:0–2
Aggregate:1–5

UEFA Intertoto Cup 2005
First round
 Bangor City F.C.
1st leg:2–1
2nd leg:2–0
Aggregate:4–1
Second round
 FK Žalgiris Vilnius
1st leg:0–2
2nd leg:2–1
Aggregate:2–3

UEFA Intertoto Cup 2006
First round
 Havnar Bóltfelag
1st leg:1–1
2nd leg:1–0
Aggregate:2–1
Second round
 Hibernian F.C.
1st leg:0–3
2nd leg:0–5
Aggregate:0–8

UEFA Intertoto Cup 2007
First round
 Cliftonville
1st leg:0–1
2nd leg:1–1
Aggregate:1–2

2009–10 UEFA Europa League
First round
 JK Nõmme Kalju
1st leg:2–1
2nd leg:0–0
Aggregate:2–1
Second round
 Bnei Yehuda Tel Aviv
1st leg:0–4
2nd leg:0–1
Aggregate:0–5

Baltic League
Baltic League 2009–10
First round
 FK Vėtra
1st leg:0–0
1st leg:0–3

References

External links
 Official website 

 
Defunct football clubs in Latvia
Association football clubs established in 1996
Association football clubs disestablished in 2009
1996 establishments in Latvia
2009 disestablishments in Latvia
Sport in Daugavpils